This is a list of notable events in music that took place in the year 1994.

Specific locations
1994 in British music
1994 in Norwegian music

Specific genres
1994 in country music
1994 in heavy metal music
1994 in hip hop music
1994 in Latin music
1994 in jazz

Events

January–February
January 19 – Bryan Adams becomes the first major Western music star to perform in Vietnam since the end of the Vietnam War.
January 21–February 5 – The Big Day Out festival takes place, again expanding from the previous year's venues to include the Gold Coast, Queensland and Auckland in New Zealand. The festival is headlined by Soundgarden, Ramones and Björk.
January 25 – Alice in Chains release their Jar of Flies album which makes its US chart debut at No. 1 on the Billboard 200, becoming the first ever EP to do so.
January 29 – The Supremes' Mary Wilson is injured when her Jeep hits a freeway median and flips over just outside Los Angeles, USA. Wilson's 14-year-old son is killed in the accident.
February 1 – Green Day release their breakthrough album Dookie, ushering in the mid-1990s punk revival. Dookie eventually achieves diamond certification.
February 7 – Blind Melon's lead singer Shannon Hoon is forced to leave the American Music Awards ceremony because of his loud and disruptive behavior. Hoon is later charged with battery, assault, resisting arrest, and destroying a police station phone.
February 11 – The three surviving members of The Beatles secretly reunite to begin recording additional music for a few of John Lennon's old unfinished demos, presented to Paul McCartney by Yoko Ono, with Jeff Lynne producing. The track, "Free As A Bird", is released as a single in late 1995 as part of the exhaustive Beatles Anthology project, reaching #2 in the UK and #6 in the United States.
February 14 – Grateful Dead's Jerry Garcia marries Deborah Koons.
February 23 – Eddie Van Halen, Chris Isaak, and B.B. King attend the ground breaking ceremony for the Hard Rock Hotel and Casino takes place in Paradise, Nevada, USA.
February 26 – The Sanremo Music Festival ends with victory for Aleandro Baldi in the "Big Artists" category, for the song "Passerà"

March–April
March 1
Selena becomes the first Tejano music singer to win a Grammy Award.
Nirvana play their final concert, in Munich.
The 36th Annual Grammy Awards are presented in New York, hosted by Garry Shandling. The soundtrack from the 1992 film The Bodyguard wins Album of the Year, while its lead single, Whitney Houston's cover of "I Will Always Love You", wins Record of the Year. The single version of "A Whole New World", performed by Peabo Bryson and Regina Belle, wins Song of the Year. Toni Braxton wins Best New Artist.
Frank Sinatra receives the Grammy Legend Award. Sinatra's acceptance speech is cut short. Other artists criticize the producer's decision during the show, and Billy Joel takes extra time to perform his song, The River of Dreams, noting that he is wasting valuable air time.
March 3 – In Rome, Nirvana's Kurt Cobain lapses into a coma after overdosing on Rohypnol and champagne.
March 5 – Grace Slick is arrested for pointing a shotgun at police in her Tiburon, California, home.
March 7 – The United States Supreme Court decision Campbell v. Acuff-Rose Music, Inc.  rules that parody can qualify as fair use. The case was spurred by 2 Live Crew releasing a parody of the Roy Orbison hit "Oh, Pretty Woman" without a license from the publishing firm Acuff-Rose Music.
March 8 – Nine Inch Nails release their second studio album The Downward Spiral. It would go on to sell over 3 million copies and be credited with helping bring industrial rock music into the mainstream.
March 13 – Selena releases her final Spanish album Amor Prohibido.  Its production had been delayed because of the launch of Selena's fashion clothing line and boutiques, and her "Selena Live!" tour in support of Live!.
March 18
Courtney Love calls the police, fearing that her husband, Nirvana's Kurt Cobain, is suicidal. Police confiscate four guns and 25 boxes of ammo from Cobain's home.
Bassist Darryl Jones replaces Bill Wyman in The Rolling Stones.
March 22 - Pantera releases Far Beyond Driven, which becomes the heaviest album to hit number 1 on the Billboard 200.
March 30 – Pink Floyd embark on what would be their last world tour before their breakup. The record-breaking tour supports their Division Bell album, with the band playing to 5,500,000 people in 68 cities and grossing over £150,000,000 (US$186,952,500).
March 31 – Madonna on Late Show with David Letterman: Madonna appears on the Late Show with David Letterman, making headlines with her profanity-laced interview. Robin Williams later describes the segment as a "battle of wits with an unarmed woman."
April 8 – The body of Kurt Cobain, lead singer of Nirvana, is found. Cobain's death, three days before, is legally declared to be suicide from a self-inflicted gunshot.
April 11 – The Offspring release Smash, which goes on to become the best selling independent album of all time and one of the most influential albums of the 90s.
April 25
Blur releases Parklife, its first album reaching #1 in UK, where it was certified "quadruple platinum".
Adam Horovitz of the Beastie Boys is sentenced to 200 hours of community service for attacking a television cameraman during funeral services for actor River Phoenix in November 1993.
April 26 – Grace Slick pleads guilty to having pointed a shotgun at police officers on March 5.
April 27 – The legendary Fillmore club reopens in San Francisco with a concert headlined by The Smashing Pumpkins.
April 30 – The 39th Eurovision Song Contest takes place in Dublin, Ireland, which becomes the first-ever country to win three consecutive contests. Its winners are Paul Harrington and Charlie McGettigan with "Rock 'N' Roll Kids", written by Brendan Graham. The interval features the first-ever public performance of Riverdance, featuring Michael Flatley and Jean Butler, which developed into the world-famous stage show.

May–June
 May 2 – A Los Angeles jury finds Michael Bolton, along with co-writer Andy Goldmark and Sony Music Entertainment, guilty of copyright infringement over the song "Love Is a Wonderful Thing". The song is ruled to be too similar to a song of the same name by The Isley Brothers.
 May 3 – The Rolling Stones arrive by yacht to a press conference in New York City to announce the Voodoo Lounge Tour kicking off in the summer.
 May 6
Pearl Jam files a complaint against Ticketmaster with the U.S. Justice Department charging that the company has a monopoly on the concert ticket business.
To help promote his new album, Alice Cooper releases a three-part comic book that followed the album The Last Temptation.
 May 9–13 – 1994 International Rostrum of Composers
 May 10
 Tupac Shakur begins serving a 15-day sentence in a county jail for attacking director Allen Hughes on the set of a video shoot.
 Weezer are introduced to the world with their self-titled debut, often referred to as the Blue Album. It would go on to become one of the most influential records of the 1990s spawning hits "Undone – The Sweater Song", "Buddy Holly" and "Say It Ain't So".
 May 26 – Michael Jackson and Lisa Marie Presley are married in the Dominican Republic.
 May 27 – The Eagles launch the Hell Freezes Over tour in Burbank, California. The reunion tour is the group's first since breaking up in 1980, but much is also made of the band becoming the first to charge over $100 per ticket for arena shows.
 June 7 – Grace Slick is sentenced to 200 hours of community service and three months' worth of Alcoholics Anonymous meetings after a March 5 incident with police officers.
 June 9 – Lisa "Left Eye" Lopes of TLC, in a domestic dispute with partner Andre Rison, sets fire to his shoes; the fire ultimately spreads to the mansion they share and destroys it.
 June 21 – George Michael loses his legal bid in a London court to be released from his contract with Sony Records.
 June 27 – Aerosmith becomes the first major band to premiere a new song on the Internet. Over 10,000 CompuServe subscribers download the free track "Head First" within its first eight days of availability.

July–August 
July 12–16 – The Yoyo A Go Go punk and indie rock festival opens in Olympia, Washington.
July 30
The Verbier Festival is launched.
In keeping with the country's new constitution and the promotion of its native language, Moldova adopts Limba noastră as its new national anthem, replacing the anthem of Romania which was previously in use.
Suede announce that guitarist Bernard Butler has left the band following fractious recording sessions for their album Dog Man Star.
August 9
Peter Maxwell Davies conducts the first performance of his fifth symphony at the Royal Albert Hall in London, as part of The Proms.
Rich Mullins and "Leave a Legacy" contest winner, 76-year-old Miguel Garcia Massiate, travel to Bogotá, Colombia, with Compassion International. The two men visit the Ciudad Sucre Center where Mullins presented them with over $40,000 that was raised on his summer '94 Ragamuffin Band tour.
Decca releases a recording of the 1949 première of Benjamin Britten's Spring Symphony for the first time.
Machine Head release their first album Burn My Eyes, which was a big success and becomes Roadrunner Records' best selling debut album.
August 11 – A compact disc copy of Sting's album Ten Summoner's Tales, released the previous year, becomes the first item securely purchased over the internet; the CD is sold for $12.48 plus shipping and handling fees.
August 12–14 – Woodstock '94 is held in Saugerties, New York. As with the original 1969 festival, attendance is swelled by a high number of gatecrashers, while heavy rains turn the festival grounds into a sea of mud. Nine Inch Nails, Metallica, Aerosmith, Bob Dylan, Crosby, Stills & Nash, Red Hot Chili Peppers, Peter Gabriel, and Green Day are among the many performers.
August 23 – Jeff Buckley releases his single, critically acclaimed, full-length studio album Grace.
August 30
Oasis release their debut album Definitely Maybe; it becomes the fastest selling debut album in the United Kingdom until 2006  when it was beaten by the Arctic Monkeys' debut album Whatever People Say I Am, That's What I'm Not. 
Luis Miguel release Segundo Romance, the best-selling Latin album of the 1990s by a male artist.  Four singles from the album were released; two of which reached #1 on the Top Latin Songs.  It received a Grammy Award and a Billboard Latin Music Award.

September–October 
September 6 
José Cura wins the Operalia – International Plácido Domingo Opera Singer Competition. 
Bad Religion release their eighth studio album (and proper major-label debut) Stranger than Fiction. This proved to be the last to feature founding guitarist/songwriter Brett Gurewitz for seven years, until his return. Gurewitz would be replaced by former Minor Threat / Dag Nasty / Junkyard guitarist Brian Baker, who turned down a touring job for R.E.M. at this time, and eventually becomes a permanent member of Bad Religion.
September 8 – Richard A. Morse, lead male vocalist of RAM, narrowly escapes a kidnapping by armed men during the band's live performance at the Hotel Oloffson in Port-au-Prince, Haiti; the attempted kidnapping was provoked by the performance of "Fèy", a RAM single banned nationwide by the military authorities.
September 15 – A 1957 audio tape of John Lennon performing with The Quarrymen on the same night he met Paul McCartney fetches £78,500 at Sotheby's, London.
October 11 – Korn, a nu metal band from Bakersfield, California, launches its self-titled debut album, peaking at No. 72 on the Billboard 200 and launching the nu metal sound. 
October 12 – Jimmy Page and Robert Plant: No Quarter (Unledded) premieres on MTV. The "unplugged" concert special featuring the two former Led Zeppelin bandmates was filmed to accompany the release of the album of the same name.

November–December 
November 20 – David Crosby undergoes a seven-hour liver transplant operation in Los Angeles.
November 30 – The Breeders guitarist Kelley Deal is arrested at her Ohio home after accepting a private-courier package containing four grams of heroin.
December 2 – Warner Music Group acquires a 49 percent share of Seattle record label Sub Pop in a deal believed to be worth over $30 million.
December 18 – Paul Oakenfold's legendary Goa Mix is first broadcast in the early hours of this day as a BBC Radio 1 Essential Mix.
December 19 – Aerosmith opens the 250-seat Mama Kin Music Hall in Boston, co-owned by the group, with a performance.
December 31 – The twenty-third annual New Year's Rockin' Eve special airs on ABC, with appearances by Melissa Etheridge, The O'Jays, Salt-n-Pepa, Hootie & the Blowfish and Jon Secada.

Also in 1994 
 Christoph von Dohnányi becomes principal guest conductor of the Philharmonia Orchestra.
 Josep Pons becomes principal conductor of the City of Granada Orchestra.
 Christian Olde Wolbers replaces Andrew Shives in Fear Factory.
 ALL part ways with their original home Cruz Records, and sign a recording contract with Interscope (though they shortly leave that label after releasing an album in the following year).
 The Offspring frontman Dexter Holland and bassist Greg Kriesel form the label Nitro Records, an incubator for successful punk artists such as AFI. The label later releases albums from classic punk bands, including The Damned and T.S.O.L., and also reissues the first Offspring album.
 Social Distortion manager Jim Guerinot forms the label Time Bomb Recordings in joint-venture agreement with Arista. The label actually exists mostly as an imprint for current releases from Social Distortion and solo albums by Mike Ness, along with the administration of the label's back catalog.
Summer – Tony Wilson attempts to revive Factory Records, in collaboration with London Records, as "Factory Too".
 Former Wolfsbane lead singer Blaze Bayley auditions and is hired by Iron Maiden.

Bands formed 
See Musical groups established in 1994

Bands disbanded 
See Musical groups disestablished in 1994

Bands reformed 
 Circle Jerks (hiatus since 1989)
 King Crimson (since 1984)
 Eagles (disbanded in 1980)

Albums released

January–March

April–June
{| class="wikitable" style="width:100%;"
|-
! colspan="2"|Date
!Album
!Artist
!Notes
|-
| rowspan="34" style="text-align:center; background:#ffa07a; textcolor:#000;"| APRIL
| style="text-align:center;"|1
| Lunar Strain || In Flames || Debut
|-
| style="text-align:center;"|4
| Rusty || Rodan ||-
|-
| rowspan="2" style="text-align:center;"|5
| The Divine Comedy || Milla Jovovich ||-
|-
| Some Change || Boz Scaggs ||-
|-
| style="text-align:center;"|7
| To the Death || M.O.P. ||-
|-
| style="text-align:center;"|8
| Smash || The Offspring || 6× Platinum and the best-selling independent label album of all time.
|-
| style="text-align:center;"|9
| Crash! Boom! Bang! || Roxette ||-
|-
| rowspan="5" style="text-align:center;"|12
| All-4-One || All-4-One ||-
|-
| The Bleeding || Cannibal Corpse ||-
|-
| Live Through This || Hole ||-
|-
| Weight || Rollins Band ||-
|-
| Whistling In The Wind || Leon Redbone ||-
|-
| rowspan="4" style="text-align:center;"|18
| And She Closed Her Eyes || Stina Nordenstam ||-
|-
| Foolish || Superchunk ||-
|-
| His 'n' Hers || Pulp ||-
|-
| How to Make Friends and Influence People || Terrorvision ||-
|-
| rowspan="4" style="text-align:center;"|19
| Crookt, Crackt, or Fly || Gastr del Sol ||-
|-
| Illmatic || Nas || Debut
|-
| In My Wildest Dreams || Kenny Chesney ||-
|-
| Well... || Katey Sagal ||-
|-
| rowspan="2" style="text-align:center;"|21
| Australian Melodrama || The Triffids ||-
|-
| Let Love In || Nick Cave and the Bad Seeds ||-
|-
| rowspan="4" style="text-align:center;"|25
| Anarchy || Chumbawamba ||-
|-
| Mädchen || Lucilectric || Germany
|-
| Parklife || Blur ||-
|-
| Santa Monica '72 || David Bowie || UK, Live
|-
| rowspan="8" style="text-align:center;"|26
| American Recordings || Johnny Cash ||-
|-
| A Date with The Smithereens || The Smithereens ||-
|-
| The Fatherless and the Widow || Sixpence None the Richer ||-
|-
| Last Day on Earth || John Cale and Bob Neuwirth ||-
|-
| Read My Mind || Reba McEntire ||-
|-
| Southernplayalisticadillacmuzik || OutKast || Debut
|-
| This Is Me || Randy Travis ||-
|-
| Throwing Copper || Live || 8× Platinum (US); 7× Platinum (Canada) 
|-
| rowspan="39" style="text-align:center; background:thistle; textcolor:#000;"| MAY
| rowspan="3" style="text-align:center;"|3
| Middle Class Revolt || The Fall ||-
|-
| The Sweetest Illusion || Basia ||-
|-
| Where It All Begins || The Allman Brothers Band ||-
|-
| style="text-align:center;"|4
| Dark Funeral || Dark Funeral || EP
|-
| rowspan="2" style="text-align:center;"|9
| Far from Home || Traffic ||-
|-
| The Very Best of Kenny G || Kenny G || Greatest Hits
|-
| rowspan="9" style="text-align:center;"|10
| Arrive All Over You || Danielle Brisebois || Debut
|-
| Diary || Sunny Day Real Estate ||-
|-
| Experimental Jet Set, Trash and No Star || Sonic Youth ||-
|-
| Four Chords & Several Years Ago || Huey Lewis and The News || Covers of popular songs from the 1950s & '60s
|-
| G. Love and Special Sauce || G. Love & Special Sauce || Gold (US)
|-
| Last of the Independents || The Pretenders ||-
|-
| Swamp Ophelia || Indigo Girls ||-
|-
| Ten Feet Tall and Bulletproof || Travis Tritt ||-
|-
| Weezer || Weezer || Debut; 3× Platinum (US), 2× Platinum (Canada)
|-
| rowspan="5" style="text-align:center;"|17
| Boingo || Oingo Boingo ||-
|-
| I Say I Say I Say || Erasure ||-
|-
| New Times || Violent Femmes ||-
|-
| A Night in San Francisco || Van Morrison || Live
|-
| Recently || Dave Matthews Band || Live EP
|-
| rowspan="3" style="text-align:center;"|23
| Seal || Seal || aka Seal II
|-
| Street Angel || Stevie Nicks ||-
|-
| Teenager of the Year || Frank Black ||-
|-
| rowspan="8" style="text-align:center;"|24
| David Byrne || David Byrne ||-
|-
| De Mysteriis Dom Sathanas || Mayhem ||-
|-
| Dulcinea || Toad the Wet Sprocket ||-
|-
| Everyone Should Be Killed || Anal Cunt ||-
|-
| Fruitcakes || Jimmy Buffett ||-
|-
| Heart, Soul & a Voice || Jon Secada ||-
|-
| Nuttin' But Love || Heavy D & the Boyz ||-
|-
| The Sun Rises in the East || Jeru the Damaja || Debut
|-
| style="text-align:center;"|25
| Humanimal || Talisman ||-
|-
| rowspan="2" style="text-align:center;"|27
| 199Quad || 69 Boyz ||-
|-
| Lifeforms || Future Sound of London ||-
|-
| rowspan="5" style="text-align:center;"|31
| Ill Communication || Beastie Boys || 3× Platinum (US)
|-
| Así Es || Gerardo ||-
|-
| Mortal Kombat: The Album || The Immortals ||-
|-
| Now I'm a Cowboy || The Auteurs ||-
|-
| Fear, Emptiness, Despair || Napalm Death ||-
|-
| rowspan="42" style="text-align:center; background:#98fb98; textcolor:#000;"|JUNE
| style="text-align:center;"|3
| Balls to Picasso || Bruce Dickinson || Europe; released in US on 7/26
|-
| style="text-align:center;"|4
| Oh My Love || Zard ||-
|-
| rowspan="5" style="text-align:center;"|7
| Pride & Glory || Pride & Glory ||-
|-
| Purple (Stone Temple Pilots album)PurpleStone Temple Pilots ||-
|-
| Germs || Patti LaBelle  ||-
|-
| Regulate... G Funk Era || Warren G || Debut
|-
| Walk On || Boston ||-
|-
| When Love Finds You || Vince Gill ||-
|-
| style="text-align:center;"|8
| Back at Your Ass for the Nine-4 || 2 Live Crew ||-
|-
| style="text-align:center;"|9
| On and On || Masaharu Fukuyama ||-
|-
| style="text-align:center;"|10
| Migratory Birds || Dave Wong || UFO Record Labels
|-
| style="text-align:center;"|13
| Split || Lush ||-
|-
| rowspan="6" style="text-align:center;"|14
| Age Ain't Nothing but a Number || Aaliyah || Debut
|-
| Pure and Simple || Joan Jett and the Blackhearts ||-
|-
| Suicidal for Life || Suicidal Tendencies ||-
|-
| Through the Fire || Peabo Bryson ||-
|-
| Turn It Upside Down || Spin Doctors ||-
|-
| Zingalamaduni || Arrested Development ||-
|-
| style="text-align:center;"|15
| Deflowered || Pansy Division ||-
|-
| style="text-align:center;"|17
| Temple Stone || Ghost || Live
|-
| rowspan="2" style="text-align:center;"|20
| Bee Thousand || Guided by Voices ||-
|-
| Genius and Brutality...Taste and Power || Brainbombs ||-
|-
| rowspan="6" style="text-align:center;"|21
| Betty || Helmet ||-
|-
| Super Bad || Terminator X ||-
|-
| Creepin on ah Come Up || Bone Thugs-n-Harmony || EP
|-
| Dance Naked || John Mellencamp ||-
|-
| Kiss My Ass: Classic Kiss Regrooved || Various Artists || Kiss tribute
|-
| Let's Go || Rancid ||-
|-
| rowspan="1" style="text-align:center;"|22
| Surface of Pain || Masquerade ||-
|-
| rowspan="2" style="text-align:center;"|27
| Keb' Mo' || Keb' Mo' || Debut
|-
| One Foot In The Grave || Beck ||-
|-
| rowspan="11" style="text-align:center;"|28
| Funkdafied || Da Brat || Debut
|-
| Get Up on It || Keith Sweat ||-
|-
| MTV Unplugged: Tony Bennett || Tony Bennett || Live
|-
| One Step Ahead of the Spider || MC 900 Ft. Jesus ||-
|-
| Same as It Ever Was || House of Pain ||-
|-
| Si Te Vas || Jon Secada ||-
|-
| Stand By for Pain || Widowmaker ||-
|-
| Tiger Bay || Saint Etienne ||-
|-
| ¡Viva Zapata! || 7 Year Bitch ||-
|-
| Welcome to Sky Valley || Kyuss ||-
|-
| Who I Am || Alan Jackson ||-
|-
| style="text-align:center;"|30
| Love Gone Sour, Suspicion, and Bad Debt || The Clarks ||-
|}

July–September

October–December

Release date unknown

 Acappella – Johnny Maestro & the Brooklyn Bridge
 Acoustic - Nitty Gritty Dirt Band
 Anything Can Happen - Leon Russell
 Aria – Asia
 Barangay Apo – Apo Hiking Society
 Benjamin – Benjamin
 The Best of Chris Rea – Chris Rea
 Big Bad Voodoo Daddy –  Big Bad Voodoo Daddy
 Bjesovi – Bjesovi
 Blue Cadet-3, Do You Connect? (EP) – Modest Mouse
 Blue House – Marcia Ball
 Blue Room – Unwritten Law
 Bright Red – Laurie Anderson 25/10/1994
 The Business Trip – Hawkwind – Live
 The Church Within – The Obsessed
 Churn – Seven Mary Three
 Clocking Out Is for Suckers – Drake Tungsten
 D Generation – D Generation
 Danzón (Dance On) – Arturo Sandoval
 Deliverance – Corrosion of Conformity
 Dreamchild – Toyah
 El nervio del volcán – Caifanes
 Firin' in Fouta – Baaba Maal
 Fishing for Luckies – The Wildhearts
 Flesh – David Gray
 Frigate – April Wine
 Giant Robot – Buckethead
 Give Out But Don't Give Up – Primal Scream
 Of Ruine or Some Blazing Starre – Current 93 
 Dial Hard – Gotthard 
 Hold on It Hurts – Cornershop 
 Goodbye to the Age of Steam – Big Big Train
 Gulfam – Hariharan
 Halo in a Haystack – Converge
 Hell Paso (EP) – At the Drive-In
 Hellig Usvart – Horde
 The Icon Is Love – Barry White
 I Hope Your Heart Is Not Brittle – Portastatic
 Imagínate – Menudo

 Isolationism – Various Artists
 Ja još spavam u tvojoj majici – Ceca
 K... jego mać – Sedes
 Klaus Schulze Goes Classic – Klaus Schulze
 Laura Pausini – Laura Pausini
 Life in the Streets – Prince Ital Joe & Marky Mark
 LL77 – Lisa Lisa
 Love, Nancy – Nancy Wilson
 Mi Forma De Sentir – Pedro Fernández
 Naghmet Hob – Najwa Karam
 Nefarious (EP) – Spoon
 Nek'af uzhas, nek'af at – Hipodil
 Och du tände stjärnorna – Thorleifs
 Old Stuff, Part Two – Anal Cunt
 Pandemonium – Killing Joke
 Pandora's Toys – Aerosmith (compilation)
 Patashnik – Biosphere
 Pawnshop Guitars – Gilby Clarke
 Peter Frampton – Peter Frampton 
 Potatoes for Christmas (EP) – Papa Roach
 Puno't Dulo – The Dawn
 Quick – Far
 Rester vrai – Florent Pagny
 Rivermaya – Rivermaya
 Safe Sex Designer Drugs & the Death of Rock 'N' Roll – Baby Chaos
 San Francisco – American Music Club
 Sing Me a Song – Miriam Makeba
 Soda Pop-Rip Off – Slant 6
 Sour – Ours
 Spit Burger Lottery – Jimmie's Chicken Shack
 Storyteller – Crystal Waters
 Stuck – Puddle of Mudd
 Television - Dr. John
 Unboxed – Free Kitten
 The Walls We Bounce Off Of - John Hartford
 Withdrawal Method – Die Monster Die
 The Woman's Boat – Toni Childs
 Yank Crime – Drive Like Jehu

 Biggest hit singles 
The following songs achieved the highest chart positions.
in the charts of 1994.

Top 40 Chart hit singles

Other chart hit singles

Notable singles

Other Notable singles

 Top ten best albums of the year 
All albums have been named albums of the year for their hits in the charts.

 TLC – CrazySexyCool Oasis – Definitely Maybe Weezer – Weezer Portishead – Dummy Nirvana – MTV Unplugged In New York Green Day – Dookie Nas – Illmatic Blur – Parklife Soundgarden – Superunknown Nine Inch Nails – The Downward Spiral Classical music 
 Thomas Beveridge – Yizkor Requiem George Crumb – Quest for guitar, soprano saxophone, harp, double bass, and percussion (two players)
 Richard Danielpour – Cello Concerto
 Mario Davidovsky – Festino for guitar, viola, violoncello, contrabass
 Peter Maxwell Davies – Symphony No. 5
 David Diamond – Trio for violin, clarinet and piano
 Lorenzo FerreroPaesaggio con figura for small orchestraPortrait for string quartet
 Osvaldo Golijov – The Dreams and Prayers of Isaac the Blind Vagn Holmboe – Symphony No. 13, M.362 (begun 1993)
 Guus Janssen – Klotz, for violin, hi-hat and small ensemble
 Karl Jenkins – Adiemus: Songs of Sanctuary Wojciech Kilar – Reign Over Us, Christ, for voice and piano
 Oliver Knussen – Horn Concerto
 György Kurtág – Stele Frederik Magle – Concerto for organ and orchestra The Infinite Second Thea Musgrave – Journey through a Japanese Landscape, for marimba and wind
 Tristan Murail – L'esprit des dunes Michael Nyman – Concerto for Trombone
 Einojuhani Rautavaara – Symphony No. 7 Angel of Light Steve Reich
 City Life
 Bagoya Marimbas Robert Simpson – String Quintet No. 2 (1991–94)
 Karlheinz Stockhausen – Weltraum (electronic music from Freitag aus Licht)
 Boris Tishchenko – Symphony No. 7
 Charles Wuorinen
 Lightenings VIII, for soprano and piano
 Piano Quintet
 Christes Crosse, for soprano and piano
 Percussion Quartet
 Guitar Variations Windfall, for wind ensemble

 Opera 
 Peter Maxwell Davies – The Doctor of Myddfai Vivian Fine – Memoirs of Uliana Rooney Adam Guettel – Floyd Collins Nicholas Lens – The Accacha Chronicles Trilogy: Flamma Flamma – The Fire Requiem Tobias Picker – Emmeline, libretto by JD McClatchy
 Alice Shields – Apocalypse Karlheinz Stockhausen – Freitag aus Licht (completed; not staged until 1996)

 Jazz 

 Musical theater 
 Beauty and the Beast – Broadway production opened at the Palace Theatre and ran for 5461 performances
 Carousel (Rodgers & Hammerstein) – Broadway revival
 Damn Yankees (Richard Adler and Jerry Ross) – Broadway revival
 Grease – Broadway revival
 Show Boat (Jerome Kern and Oscar Hammerstein II) – Broadway revival
 Sunset Boulevard (Andrew Lloyd Webber) – Broadway production opened at the Minskoff Theatre and ran for 977 performances

 Musical films 
 Aag Aur Chingari Andaz, with music by Bappi Lahiri
 Airheads Backbeat Chaand Kaa Tukdaa, starring Sridevi
 Fear of a Black Hat Gandugali, with music by Sadhu Kokila.
 Hated: GG Allin and the Murder Junkies Hum Aapke Hain Koun..!, with music by Raamlaxman
 Immortal Beloved, biopic of Ludwig van Beethoven
 The Lion King – animated feature film with songs by Elton John and Tim Rice
 Min fynske barndom, biopic of composer Carl Nielsen 
 Sukham Sukhakaram, with music by Ravindra Jain.
 The Swan Princess – animated feature film
 That's Entertainment! III Thumbelina – animated feature film.

 Births 
January 13 – Asta, Australian singer-songwriter
January 14 – Kai, Korean singer and dancer (EXO)
January 18
Minzy, South Korean singer, rapper and dancer
Jiyoung, South Korean singer and actress
January 23 – Vera Blue, Australian indie singer-songwriter
January 28 – Maluma, Colombian singer and rapper
February 1
Skylar Laine, American singer-songwriter
Harry Styles, British musician, singer-songwriter, activist, (pop singer of boy band One Direction) (worked with Taylor Swift, Mabel, Stevie Nicks, Kacey Musgraves)
February 3 – Orla Gartland, Irish singer, songwriter and YouTuber
February 8 – Nikki Yanofsky, Canadian singer
February 10 – Seulgi, Korean singer and dancer (Red Velvet)
February 14
Paul Butcher, American actor and singer
Becky Hill, English singer and songwriter
February 16 – Ava Max, American singer-songwriter
February 17 – Angie Miller, American singer-songwriter and pianist
February 18 – J-Hope , South Korean rapper, songwriter, dancer and record producer, member of BTS
February 21 – Wendy, Korean singer (Red Velvet)
February 22 – Rachael Leahcar, (Italian) Australian multi lingual singer-songwriter, musician, performer, writer, and runner composer (The Voice (Australia)) (team and toured with Delta Goodrem)
February 23 – Little Simz,  English rapper, singer and actress
February 24 – Earl Sweatshirt, American rapper
February 28 – Jake Bugg, English singer-songwriter and musician
March 1 – Justin Bieber, Canadian singer
March 3 - Sam Asghari, Iranian-American actor, dancer, fitness guru and model (Married to Britney Spears)
March 10 – Bad Bunny,  Puerto Rican Latin trap and reggaeton singer.
March 12 – Christina Grimmie, American singer, songwriter, musician, multi-instrumentalist, actress and YouTuber (d. 2016)
March 13 – Zella Day, American singer, songwriter and musician
March 14 – Ansel Elgort, American actor, singer and DJ 
March 15 – Lynn Gunn, American musician (PVRIS) 
March 16 
 Connie Glynn, English author, former influencer, and member of snaggletooth, a "Very haunted" band. 
 Camilo (singer), Colombian singer, musician and songwriter. (Married to Evaluna Montaner) 
March 19 – Fletcher, American actress, singer, and songwriter.
March 22 – Dax, Canadian rapper
March 28
Dreezy, American hip hop recording artist, rapper, musician
Catherine and Lizzy Ward Thomas, twin English country-pop musicians
Jackson Wang, Hong Kong rapper 
March 29 – Sulli, singer and actress (d. 2019)
April 1 – Ella Eyre, English singer-songwriter
April 4 – Risako Sugaya, Japanese singer
April 9 – Bladee, Swedish rapper, singer, songwriter, fashion designer and member of the musical group Drain Gang.
April 11 – Duncan Laurence, Dutch singer-songwriter, winner of Eurovision Song Contest 2019
April 12
Airi Suzuki, Japanese singer
Sehun, Korean singer, rapper and actor (EXO)
April 18 – Aminé, American rapper, singer and songwriter
April 24 – Jordan Fisher, American singer, dancer and actor
April 25
Sam Fender, English actor, singer-songwriter, musician and activist
Maggie Rogers, American singer-songwriter and record producer
April 26 - Michael Pollack,  American songwriter, singer, multi-instrumentalist, and record producer
May 5 – Celeste, American-born British singer
May 7 - Laurel (musician). British musician
May 11 - Howard Lawrence of EDM House garage band, Disclosure
May 17 – Julie Anne San Jose, Filipina actress, singer, television personality
May 24 – Dimash Kudaibergen, Kazakh singer, songwriter, and multi-instrumentalist
May 25 - 
 Royal & the Serpent, American singer and songwriter
 Nathan Dawe, English DJ and producer (Annie-Marie, Little Mix, Ella Henderson) 
May 28 – Alec Benjamin, American musician
May 30 - Madeon, French DJ and record producer
May 31 - Lil Aaron, American rapper, singer and songwriter 
June 4 – Olivia Somerlyn, known as LIVVIA, American pop singer-songwriter
June 14 – Scarlxrd, British rapper and songwriter
June 25 - Egor Kreed, Russian rapper
June 27 - Malinda Kathleen Reese, American stage actress, multi-instrumentalist, and singer-songwriter, comedian, YouTuber, and activist (Founder, Leader, Creator of Twisted Translations/ Google Translate Sings / Translator Fails)
July 4 – Era Istrefi, Kosovar singer
July 5 – Sơn Tùng M-TP, Vietnamese singer-songwriter
July 7
Ashton Irwin, Australian drummer and singer-songwriter (5 Seconds of Summer)
July 9 - SG Lewis,  English singer-songwriter, musician and record producer (Tove Lo)
July 10 – Angel Haze, American rapper and singer
July 11 – Nina Nesbitt, Scottish singer-songwriter, model, and musician
July 14 - Bibi Bourelly, German-American singer-songwriter 
July 17 – Kali Uchis,  Colombian-American singer-songwriter, record producer, music video director, and fashion designer
July 31 – Lil Uzi Vert, American rapper, singer, songwriter
August 2 – Jacob Collier, British musician, singer-songwriter, composer, music producer, and multi-instrumentalist
August 8 – Lauv (Ari Leff), American singer-songwriter and record producer
August 16 – Áine Cahill, Irish singer-songwriter
August 17 – Phoebe Bridgers, American indie rock singer-songwriter, musician and artist
August 18 – Bobby Andonov, Australian singer-songwriter and actor
August 22 – Jimilian, Danish singer
August 28 – Felix Jaehn, German/Dutch DJ and record producer
August 30 – Kwon So-hyun, South Korean actress and singer 
August 31 - MoStack British Rapper and Singer (Anne-Marie) 
September 1 – Bianca Ryan, American singer
September 12 – RM, South Korean rapper, songwriter and record producer, member of BTS
September 17
Taylor Ware, American singer and yodeler
Chen Yihan, Chinese pianist and composer
September 22
Emily Burns, English musician and singer-songwriter
G Flip, Australian singer-songwriter, producer, musician, drummer and activist 
September 23 – Zolita, American singer-songwriter, director, photographer and activist
September 28 – Trevor Daniel, American singer-songwriter
September 29 – Halsey, American singer-songwriter, artist and activist
October 2 – Shekhinah, South African singer-songwriter
October 4 – Sarah Aarons, Australian singer, songwriter, musician
October 15 – Sebastián Yatra, Colombian singer
October 24 – Krystal Jung, American-South Korean singer
October 15 – Lil' Kleine, Dutch musician
November 3 – Ella Mai, English singer and songwriter
November 4 – keshi, American singer
November 8 – Lauren Alaina, American country music singer, songwriter and actress
November 9 – MNEK, British singer-songwriter and record producer
November 24 – Reece Mastin, winner of The X Factor (Australia), rock-soul-blues singer-songwriter, and musician (English born, Australian)
November 26 – Emma Portner, American dancer and choreographer
November 28 – Bonnie Anderson, Australian singer-songwriter
December 13 – Ibeyi (Lisa-Kaindé Diaz and Naomi Diaz), twin French singer-songwriters
December 19
Michele Bravi, Italian singer
Nathan Evans, Scottish musician
December 21, Thelma Plum,  an Aboriginal Australian singer, songwriter, guitarist and musician

 Deaths 
January 4 – R. D. Burman, music director, 54
January 6 – Harold Sumberg, violinist, 88
January 15
 Harry Nilsson, singer, songwriter, 52 (heart attack)
 Georges Cziffra, pianist, 72
January 22 – Rhett Forrester, American singer-songwriter, 37 (shot)
January 25 – Bertha Rawlinson, New Zealand opera singer, composer and music teacher, 83
January 30 – Rudolf Schwarz, conductor, 88
February 5 – Tiana Lemnitz, operatic soprano, 96
February 7 – Witold Lutosławski, composer, 81
February 8 – Raymond Scott, composer and bandleader, 85
February 19 – Micho Russell, Irish tin whistle player and collector of traditional music and folklore, 79
February 22 – Papa John Creach, blues violinist, 76
February 24
Jean Sablon, French singer, 87
Dinah Shore, singer, actress, 77
March 3 – Karel Kryl, Czech folk singer, 49
March 6 – Yvonne Fair, African-American singer, 51
March 13 – Danny Barker, jazz musician and composer, 85
March 16 – Nicolas Flagello, composer, 66
March 18 – Ephraim Lewis, soul and R&B singer, 26
March 22 – Dan Hartman, singer, 42 (brain tumour)
March 23 – Donald Swann, pianist, composer and entertainer (Flanders and Swann), 70
April 5
Rowland Greenberg, Norwegian jazz trumpeter, 73
Kurt Cobain, singer & guitarist (Nirvana), 27 (self-inflicted shotgun wound)
April 7 – Lee Brilleaux, British R&B singer (Dr. Feelgood), 41 (cancer)
April 19 – Larry Davis, blues singer and guitarist, 57
May 23 – Joe Pass, jazz guitarist, 65 (liver cancer)
May 25 – Eric Gale, jazz guitarist, 55 (lung cancer)
May 26 – Sonny Sharrock, jazz guitarist, 53
May 27 – Red Rodney, bop trumpeter, 66
May 29 – Oliver Jackson, jazz drummer, 61
May 31
Uzay Heparı, Turkish composer, music producer, songwriter and actor, 24 (motorcycle accident)
Herva Nelli, operatic soprano, 85
June 4 – Earle Warren, saxophonist, 79
June 11 – Robert Beadell, composer, 68
June 14 – Henry Mancini, composer, 70
June 15 – Manos Hadjidakis, composer, 68
June 16 – Kristen Pfaff, bass guitarist (Hole), 27 (heroin overdose)
June 25
Kin Vassy, songwriter, performer, co-lead singer and guitarist of The First Edition 1969–72 (lung cancer), 50
DJ Train, producer (smoke inhalation)
June 29 – Kurt Eichhorn, conductor, 85
July 2 – Marion Williams, gospel singer, 66
July 31 – Anne Shelton, British singer, 70
August 6 – Domenico Modugno, Italian singer and songwriter, 66
September 2 – Roy Castle, musician and all-round entertainer, 62 (lung cancer)
September 3 – Major Lance, R&B singer, 55
September 6
Nicky Hopkins, session musician, keyboardist, 50 (complications from intestinal surgery)
Max Kaminsky, jazz trumpeter and bandleader, 85
September 7 – Eric Crozier, librettist, 79
September 13 – John Stevens, jazz musician
September 20 – Jule Styne, songwriter, 88
September 24 – Urmas Alender, singer, 40 (drowned in MS Estonia sinking)
September 29 – Cheb Hasni, Algerian Raj musician, 26 (murdered)
October 4 – Danny Gatton, guitarist, 49
October 19 – Martha Raye, singer and comedian, 88
October 22
Jimmy Miller, record producer, 52
Shlomo Carlebach, Jewish songwriter
October 26 – Wilbert Harrison, R&B singer, pianist, guitarist and harmonica player, 65
October 27 – Robert White, Motown session guitarist, 57
October 31
Lester Sill, record executive, 76
Erling Stordahl, Norwegian singer, 71
November 4 – Fred "Sonic" Smith, MC5 guitarist, 46 (heart attack)
November 7 – Shorty Rogers, jazz trumpeter, 70
November 11 – Elizabeth Maconchy, composer, 87
November 18 – Cab Calloway, jazz and scat singer, 86
November 21 – Juancho Rois, Colombian vallenato musician, accordionist, and composer, 35 (plane crash)
November 28 – Vic Legley, Belgian violist and composer of French birth, 79
December 8 – Antônio Carlos Jobim, bossa nova composer and songwriter, 67
December 10 – Garnett Silk, reggae singer, 28 (house fire)

 Awards 
 The following artists are inducted into the Rock and Roll Hall of Fame: John Lennon, Elton John, Grateful Dead, The Band, Bob Marley, Duane Eddy, Rod Stewart, and The Animals
 Inductees of the GMA Gospel Music Hall of Fame include Tennessee Ernie Ford

 Filmfare Awards 
 Kumar Sanu – Filmfare Best Male Playback Award
 Filmfare Best Music Director Awards – Rahul Dev Burman

 Grammy Awards 
 36th Annual Grammy Awards

 Country Music Association Awards 
 1994 Country Music Association Awards

 Eurovision Song Contest 
 Eurovision Song Contest 1994

 Mercury Music Prize 
 Elegant Slumming – M People wins.

 Juno Award 
 Rascalz'' – Juno Award Best rap album

Charts

KROQ 
 KROQ Top 106.7 Countdown of 1994

Triple J Hottest 100 
 Triple J Hottest 100, 1994

See also 
 1994 in British music
 Record labels established in 1994

References

Citations

 
20th century in music
Music by year